Appleby was a parliamentary constituency in the county of Westmorland in England. It existed for two separate periods: from 1295 to 1832, and from 1885 to 1918.

Appleby was enfranchised as parliamentary borough in 1295, and abolished by the Great Reform Act 1832. It returned two Members of Parliament (MPs) using the bloc vote system. It was represented in the House of Commons of England until 1707, in the House of Commons of Great Britain from 1707 to 1800, and finally in the House of Commons of the United Kingdom from 1801 to 1832. Its best-known MP was William Pitt the Younger who became prime minister in 1783 at the age of 24.

For the 1885 general election the Redistribution of Seats Act created a county constituency of the same name, which returned a single MP elected by the first-past-the-post system. The county constituency was abolished at the 1918 general election.

History

The borough (1295–1832)
The parliamentary borough of Appleby consisted of the town of Appleby, the county town of Westmorland, and was consistently represented in the House of Commons from the Model Parliament of 1295 until the Reform Act.

The right to vote rested with the occupiers of around a hundred burgage tenements. By the 18th century, the majority of the burgages were owned by the Lowther and Tufton families, which enabled them to put in reliable tenants at election time and ensure their complete control of who was elected. The seats were frequently kept for members of those families, but Appleby's other representatives included William Pitt the younger, who was MP for Appleby when he became prime minister in 1783 (although he stood down at the following general election when he was instead elected for Cambridge University).

A later member for Appleby was Viscount Howick, subsequently (as Earl Grey) the Prime Minister whose administration passed the Great Reform Act of 1832; but Grey's history as a former MP for the town did not save it from losing both its members under the Act. Appleby was regarded as a classic example of a pocket borough, completely in the control of its owners who were also the major local landowners, and with a population of only 1,233 at the 1831 census unlikely to be freed from their influence even by widening the franchise. Nevertheless, as the only county town to be disfranchised, Appleby was one of the more controversial cases in the debates on the reform bill, the opposition making unsuccessful attempts to amend the bill so as to save at least one of its MPs.

After abolition the borough was absorbed into the Westmorland county constituency.

The county constituency (1885–1918)
The Appleby constituency created for the 1885 election was, in full, "The Appleby or Northern Division of Westmorland", and was sometimes referred to as Westmorland North. It consisted of the whole of the northern half of the county, including the towns of Ambleside, Grasmere and Kirkby Stephen. It was abolished at the 1918 general election, the whole county henceforth being united in a single Westmorland constituency.

Members of Parliament

MPs 1295–1660

MPs 1660–1832

Notes

MPs 1885–1918

Election results 1885–1918

Elections in the 1880s

Elections in the 1890s

Elections in the 1900s 

Figures are those following a recount

Elections in the 1910s 

General Election 1914/15:

Another General Election was required to take place before the end of 1915. The political parties had been making preparations for an election to take place and by the July 1914, the following candidates had been selected; 
Unionist: Lancelot Sanderson
Liberal:

Election results before 1832

Elections in the 1830s

 Caused by Tufton's succession to the peerage, becoming 11th Earl of Thanet

Elections in the 18th century

Election results taken from the History of Parliament Trust series.

Death of Sandford

Succession of Tufton as 7th Earl of Thanet

Dodington chose to sit for Bridgwater

References

Michael Brock, The Great Reform Act (London: Hutchinson, 1973)
D Brunton & D H Pennington, “Members of the Long Parliament” (London: George Allen & Unwin, 1954)
 Maija Jansson (ed.), Proceedings in Parliament, 1614 (House of Commons) (Philadelphia: American Philosophical Society, 1988) 
J Holladay Philbin, "Parliamentary Representation 1832 – England and Wales" (New Haven: Yale University Press, 1965)

Politics of Cumbria
Parliamentary constituencies in North West England (historic)
Constituencies of the Parliament of the United Kingdom established in 1295
Constituencies of the Parliament of the United Kingdom disestablished in 1832
Constituencies of the Parliament of the United Kingdom established in 1885
Constituencies of the Parliament of the United Kingdom disestablished in 1918
Constituencies of the Parliament of the United Kingdom represented by a sitting Prime Minister
Rotten boroughs
Appleby-in-Westmorland